Jar is a station served both by the Oslo Metro and the Oslo Tramway located in Bærum, just west of Lysakerelva which divides Oslo and Bærum. The track is shared, the tram line (Lilleaker Line) joins with the rapid transit line (Kolsås Line) on the Oslo side of the river. The station had a yellow penthouse and contained a newspaper outlet. However, after the reconstruction, the penthouse was reinstated but has a different colour. 

Formerly, the entire line to Kolsås was part of the tram network. Jar was originally a terminus for the defunct line 10, and had a balloon loop. However, this has been removed and since the 2nd of December 2007, tram operations (line 13) have returned on this line from Jar to Bekkestua.

As of December 2016, the Tram line 13 is running trams (every 20 minutes, 15 at  weekends.) to Bekkestua. The Oslo Metro line 3 also runs with an interval of every 15 minutes.

References

External links

Images from the 2010 reopening

Oslo Metro stations in Bærum
Oslo Tramway stations in Bærum
Railway stations opened in 1924
1924 establishments in Norway